Llanfair United are an amateur football team who are from Llanfair Caereinion, Powys, Wales. They play in the Ardal Leagues North East whilst their reserve side play in the JT Hughes Montgomeryshire Division 1. They play their games at Mount Field which is situated in the town itself.

The club’s most successful periods were in the 1970s and 1980s when they won numerous Montgomeryshire Amateur League championships. The club is also the only club to win the Emrys Morgan Cup 5 times. In 2012, the club set up a Ladies team and a Youth Team (under 19's).

In 2013–14 the club had arguably their most successful season to date. The first team won the Central Wales Cup, the Reserve side won the Montgomeryshire Amateur League, the Ladies won the North Powys league and league cup whilst the Youths won the Mid Wales Youth League. In 2014–15, the first team won the Mid Wales League and the Montgomeryshire Challenge Cup, both for the first time in the club's history.

Llanfair won the 2018–19 Mid Wales Football League to gain promotion to the newly created second tier FAW Championship North & Mid.

Llanfair now play in the Ardal Leagues North East.

Honours 
Spar Mid Wales Division 1
Winners (1): 2014–15
Runners Up (1): 2013–14

Spar Mid Wales Division 2
Winners (1): 2012–13

Montgomeryshire Amateur League Division 1
Winners (9): 1946–47, 1947–48, 1972–73, 1974–75 1984–85, 1985–86, 1988–89, 1989–90, 2013–14*, 2015–16* (*Reserves)
Runners Up (12): 1937–38, 1938–39, 1948–49, 1950–51, 1953–54, 1962–63, 1970–71. 1981–82, 1983–84, 1990–91, 1991–92, 1992–93

Montgomeryshire Amateur League Division 2
Winners (2): 1978–79 (Reserves), 2011–12 (Reserves)
Runners Up (1): 1990–91 (Wanderers)

North Powys Ladies League
Winners (1): 2013–14

Mid Wales Youth League
Winners (1): 2013–14, 2014–15

Central Wales Challenge Cup
2013–14

ER Jenkins Cup
2011–12, 2012–13

J.Emrys Morgan Cup
1977–78 (Reserves), 1983–84, 1985–86, 1990–91, 2015–16 (Reserves)

Montgomerysire Town Cup
1989–90, 1992–93, 2001–02

Montgomeryshire Village Cup
1972–73

Montgomeryshire League Cup
1949–50, 1971–72, 1972–73, 1990–91

Montgomeryshire Cup
2014–15

North Powys Ladies League Cup
2013–14

Mid Wales Youth Cup
1978–79

Former players 
1. Players that have played/managed in the Football League or any foreign equivalent to this level (i.e. fully professional league).
2. Players with full international caps.
3. Players that hold a club record or have captained the club.
 Trefor Owen
 Kingsley Whiffen

References

External links
 Official Website

Football clubs in Wales
Sport in Powys
Association football clubs established in 1896
Mid Wales Football League clubs
Cymru Alliance clubs
Cymru North clubs
Llanfair Caereinion
Ardal Leagues clubs
Montgomeryshire Football League clubs